The 1947 Queensland state election was held on 3 May 1947.

By-elections
 On 2 March 1946, Les Wood (Labor) was elected to succeed Herbert Yeates (Country), who had died on 24 December 1945, as the member for East Toowoomba.
 On 10 September 1949, Jim Donald (Labor) was elected to succeed Frank Cooper (Labor), who had resigned on 12 March 1946, as the member for Bremer.

Retiring Members
Note: Country MLA Harry Clayton (Wide Bay) died prior to the election. No by-election was held.

Labor
Ted Hanson MLA (Buranda)
John Hayes MLA (Nundah)
Aubrey Slessar MLA (Dalby)
Tommy Williams MLA (Port Curtis)

Country
Jim Edwards MLA (Nanango)
Harry Walker MLA (Cooroora)

People's Party
John Chandler MLA (Hamilton)

Candidates
Sitting members at the time of the election are shown in bold text.

See also
 1947 Queensland state election
 Members of the Queensland Legislative Assembly, 1944–1947
 Members of the Queensland Legislative Assembly, 1947–1950
 List of political parties in Australia

References
 

Candidates for Queensland state elections